Greg Cronin (born June 2, 1963) is an American professional ice hockey coach and current head coach of the Colorado Eagles of the AHL. Prior to joining the Eagles in 2018, Cronin held coaching positions with the New York Islanders and Toronto Maple Leafs of the NHL, the Bridgeport Sound Tigers of the AHL, and Colorado College, the University of Maine, and Northeastern University of the NCAA.

Coaching career
Cronin began his career as an assistant coach at his alma mater, Colby College in 1987–88 and then became a graduate assistant at the University of Maine from 1988 to 1990, then as an assistant for Colorado College from 1990 to 1993. He returned to Maine to be an assistant coach from 1993 to 1995 and was named interim head coach following a scandal that banished head coach Shawn Walsh from the bench for one year in 1995–96, leading the Black Bears to the Hockey East championship game in 1996 where they lost to Providence College, 3–2. After four years with Maine, he spent one year as the head coach of the USNTDP Juniors of USA Hockey before joining the New York Islanders in 1998. Cronin served as an assistant coach with the Islanders for 5 seasons before being named their Director of Player Development and head coach of their minor league affiliate, the Bridgeport Sound Tigers, in 2003. He coached the Sound Tigers for 2 seasons with great success, going 78–61–16–5.

In 2005, Cronin replaced Bruce Crowder as head coach of the Northeastern Huskies of the NCAA. Cronin inherited a team that graduated almost all of their key players from a 15–18–5 team and had little hope of competing in the short term. The team went 3–24–7 in 2005–06 before posting a 13–18–5 record the following year behind the development of many of Cronin's recruits. The team further improved to 16–18–3 in 2007–08, winning their first playoff game in years in the 2–1 series loss to the University of Vermont. The Huskies opened the 2008–09 season expected to contend for home ice advantage in Hockey East (4th place or better) for the first time since 1997–98.  The Huskies went 23–9–4 in the regular season, leading the conference until the final day when they lost at Boston College 4–1, falling to second place in Hockey East in the process. Season highlights included Northeastern's first sweep of Maine in 25 years, a win over Boston College in the Beanpot for the first time since 1994, and winning 2 of 3 games against both of the previous season's Hockey East Finalists, Vermont and Boston College. The Huskies opened the postseason by defeating the University of Massachusetts Amherst in the Hockey East Quarterfinals at Matthews Arena, 2 games to 1, with the 3rd game being won in overtime on a goal by freshman Alex Tuckerman. On February 18, 2011, Cronin was suspended for six games due to possible recruitment violations, but was reinstated prior to Northeastern's quarterfinal playoff series with Boston University. Northeastern would win that series, capturing two of three games at Agganis Arena and make it to the Hockey East semifinals for the second time in three years, where they fell to Boston College.

After six seasons as head coach of the Huskies, Cronin returned to USA hockey before joining the Toronto Maple Leafs as an assistant coach in 2011. He remained with the Maple Leafs until rejoining the New York Islanders in 2014. After three years as an assistant coach and one year as an associate coach, Cronin left the Islanders to become head coach of the Colorado Eagles in 2018.

Personal
Cronin lives in Boston, and he has many family connections at Northeastern.  His father, Don, and his uncle, Jerry, both played hockey for the Huskies in the 1950s and 1960s, and his cousin Kerry played for the women's teams from 1983–86, winning three Beanpots. Greg Cronin spent three years playing hockey for Colby College with his older brother Donny Cronin Jr.

Head coaching record

† Cronin served as the head coach for Maine during the year-long suspension of Shawn Walsh starting on December 23, 1995

References

External links
 
 Coaching record, uscho.com
 

1963 births
Living people
American ice hockey coaches
Colby College alumni
Colby Mules men's ice hockey coaches
Colorado College Tigers men's ice hockey coaches
Maine Black Bears men's ice hockey coaches
New York Islanders coaches
Northeastern Huskies men's ice hockey coaches
Toronto Maple Leafs coaches